Telha is a municipality in the Brazilian state of Sergipe.

References

Municipalities in Sergipe